Thaumasus gigas is a species of beetle in the family Cerambycidae, the only species in the genus Thaumasus.

References

Torneutini
Monotypic beetle genera